Norwegian Augustana Synod (NAS) was a Lutheran church body in the United States from 1870 to 1890. The group's original name was the Norwegian-Danish Augustana Synod in America. The name was shorted in 1878.

Background
The NAS was created out of the Scandinavian Augustana Synod (SAS) in 1870. The NAS was primarily made up of Norwegians (along with some Danes). At the same time the NAS was being formed, another group of Norwegians and Danes created out of the SAS the Conference of the Norwegian-Danish Evangelical Lutheran Church of America (The Conference).

The difference between the NAS and the Conference was the inclusion of the Book of Concord. The NAS wanted to include the whole book as confessional base. The Conference just wanted the three ecumenical creeds, Luther's Small Catechism and the Unaltered Augsburg Confession.

The two groups along the Anti-Missourian Brotherhood group from the Norwegian Synod united in 1890 to form the United Norwegian Lutheran Church of America.

Presidents
O. J. Hatlestad   1870–1880
Ole Andrewson 1880–1885
Andreas Wright 1885–1888
O. J. Hatlestad   1888–1890

See also

The Norwegian Lutheran Church in the United States

References
 The Lutheran Church-Missouri Synod Christian Cyclopedia

Other source
Nelson, E. Clifford, and Fevold, Eugene L. The Lutheran Church among Norwegian-Americans: a history of the Evangelical Lutheran Church (Minneapolis, MN: Augsburg Publishing House, 1960)

Lutheran denominations in North America
Evangelical Lutheran Church in America predecessor churches
History of Christianity in the United States
Religious organizations established in 1870
Christian denominations established in the 19th century
Lutheranism in the United States
Norwegian-American culture